The Long Island Children’s Museum (LICM) is a Children's museum located on the campus of Mitchel Field in Uniondale, New York.

History 
The museum was established in 1993 in the old Newsday building across from Roosevelt Field Mall in East Garden City. It moved in 2001 to a former airplane hangar with 40,000 square feet spread over two stories. The county provided the hangar rent-free under a 60-year lease and the museum is to keep all revenue.

Description 
It has 12 galleries with interactive exhibits, three studio workshops and a 150-seat theater. The museum can host over 250,000 visitors per year.  The outdoor play area, known as "Our Backyard," opens each spring. The play area has become the most popular part of the museum and includes vegetable gardens where visitors can harvest various vegetables directly from the garden.

Awards 
LICM is a recipient of the National Medal for Museum and Library Service and has been designated a "Primary Institution" by the New York State Council on the Arts.

See also 

 List of museums on Long Island

Notes

External links
 

Children's museums in New York (state)
Garden City, New York
Museums established in 1993
1993 establishments in New York (state)